USS LST-547 was a United States Navy  in commission from 1944 to 1946.

Construction and commissioning
LST-547 was laid down on 24 December 1943 at Evansville, Indiana, by the Missouri Valley Bridge and Iron Company. She was launched on 19 February 1944, sponsored by Mrs. Harold Jourdan, and commissioned on 30 March 1944.

Service history
LST-547 was assigned to the Pacific Theater of Operations during World War II. She saw no combat action.

Following the war, LST-547 performed occupation duty in the Far East and until mid-February 1946, when she returned to the United States.

Decommissioning and disposal
LST-547 was decommissioned on 28 February 1946 and stricken from the Navy List on 31 October 1947. On 26 May 1948, she was sold to the Bethlehem Steel Company of Bethlehem, Pennsylvania, for scrapping.

References

NavSource Online: Amphibious Photo Archive LST-547

 

LST-542-class tank landing ships
World War II amphibious warfare vessels of the United States
Ships built in Evansville, Indiana
1944 ships